Lea Whitford is a Democratic member of the Montana Senate who represented the 8th District from 2015 to 2019.  She was previously a member of the Montana House of Representatives for the 16th District from 2013 to 2015. She defeated former representative Lila Evans in 2012 by a margin of 1,823 to 935.

She is a member of the Blackfeet Nation, and lives on a ranch in Cut Bank, Montana. She has taught at Blackfeet Community College and Browning High School in Browning, Montana.

References

External links
 Official legislative webpage

21st-century American politicians
21st-century American women politicians
Blackfeet Nation people
Living people
Democratic Party members of the Montana House of Representatives
Native American state legislators in Montana
Native American women in politics
Women state legislators in Montana
People from Cut Bank, Montana
Year of birth missing (living people)
Montana State University–Northern alumni
Montana State University alumni
Educators from Montana
American women educators